Hokkai Maru may refer to:

 , Japanese World War II-era stores ship
 , Japanese World War II-era transport ship
 , Japanese World War II-era rescue tug
  (ex-Hokkai Maru No. 2), Japanese World War II-era transport ship
  (ex-Hokkai Maru No. 1), Japanese World War II-era transport ship

Japanese Navy ship names
Imperial Japanese Navy ship names